Rangjung Dorje (1284–1339) was the third Karmapa (head of the Karma Kagyu, the largest sub-school of the Kagyu) and an important figure in the history of Tibetan Buddhism, who helped to spread Buddha-nature teachings in Tibetan Buddhism.

Biography
Rangjung Dorje visited China, where the emperor Toghon Temur became his disciple. Upon his death, Rangjung Dorje's face is said to have appeared in the moon there. As a group, the Karmapa Lamas were among the earliest recognized Tulku, or lamas reincarnated as deities or lineage of deceased teachers. The first Karmapas were influential in the Yuan and Ming courts as well as the Tangut Western Xia Kingdom.

Lineage
Born to a Nyingma family, Rangjung Dorje was a lineage-holder in both the Kagyu and the Nyingma (Dzogchen):

Teachings and influence

Buddha-nature and shentong
In 1321 the famous scholar Dolpopa (1292-1361) visited Tsurphu Monastery for the first time and had extensive discussions with Rangjung Dorje about doctrinal issues. It appears that Rangjung Dorje almost certainly influenced the development of some of Dolpopa's theories, possibly including his Zhentong (gzhan stong) method.

According to Karma phrin las, Dri lan yid, 91-92, his teacher, Chödrak Gyatso, the Seventh Karmapa, interpreted the nature of Zhentong (gzhan stong) accepted by Rangjung Dorje.

Chod
Schaeffer (1995: p.15) conveys that the Third Karmapa was a systematizer of the Chöd developed by Machig Labdrön and lists a number of his works on Chod consisting of redactions, outlines and commentaries.

Dzogchen
Yungtön Dorjepel (1284-1365), (the previous incarnation of the First Panchen Lama, Khedrup Je), studied the Great Perfection due to the great inspiration of Rangjung Dorje.

Writings
Rangjung Dorje was a noted scholar who composed many significant texts, the most famous of which is  the Profound Inner Meaning (Wylie: zab mo nang don), which concern the Vajrayana inner yoga practices. Other important texts of his include:
 the Aspiration Prayer of Mahamudra (Wylie: nge don phyag rgya chen po'i smon lam gyi 'grel pa grub pa mchog gi zhal lung),  
 the Prayer to the Lineage of Chö, 
 the thirty-six verse doha (Sanskrit)  Distinguishing Consciousness from Wisdom (Wylie: rnam shes ye shes ‘byed pa), 
 Instructions on Sahajayoga Mahamudra , 
 A Treatise on Buddha Nature (Wylie: de bzhin gshegs pa'i snying po gtan la dbab pa; or, de bzhin gshegs pa'i snying po bstan pa).

Notes

References

Sources

 Lama Kunsang, Lama Pemo, Marie Aubèle (2012). History of the Karmapas: The Odyssey of the Tibetan Masters with the Black Crown. Snow Lion Publications, Ithaca, New York. .

Further reading
 Schaeffer, Kurtis R. (1995), The Englightened Heart of Buddhahood: A Study and Translation of the Third Karma pa Rang byung rdo rje's Work on Tathagatagarbha. (Wylie: de bzhin pa'i snying po gtan la dbab pa). University of Washington.

External links
Biography
 

Texts
 Rangjung Dorje (root text); Venerable Khenchen Thrangu Rinpoche (commentary); Peter Roberts (translator) (2001), [http://www.rinpoche.com/teachings/conwisdom.pdf Transcending Ego - Distinguishing Consciousness from Wisdom] (Wylie: rnam shes ye shes ‘byed pa).
 Rangjung Dorje (root text); Venerable Khenchen Thrangu Rinpoche (commentary); John Rockwell (translator), An Aspirational Prayer for Mahamudra
 Rangjung Dorje (root text); Venerable Khenchen Thrangu Rinpoche (commentary); Peter Roberts (translator) (1990), A Treatise entitled: “A Teaching on the Essence of the Tathagatas (The Tathagatagarbha)"

1284 births
1339 deaths
Nyingma lamas
3
Tibetan Buddhists from Tibet
13th-century Tibetan people
14th-century Tibetan people
14th-century lamas